The Formula Regional Middle East Championship is an FIA-certified Formula Regional racing series, started in 2023. This championship races in the Emirati venues from the 2022 Formula Regional Asian Championship and Kuwait Motor Town. The promoter of Formula Regional Asian Championship (Top Speed) decided to relaunch Formula Regional Asian Championship in Southeastern Asia, so the championship racing on the Middle Eastern circuits  circuits was renamed the Formula Regional Middle East Championship.

Car
The championship features Tatuus-designed and built F.3 T-318 cars. The cars include a number of enhanced safety features including the halo. The cars are powered by a  Alfa Romeo TBi/Autotecnica  turbo engine.

Circuits

Notes

References

External links
 

Asian auto racing series
2023 establishments in Asia
Formula Regional